The Roman Catholic Archdiocese of Salta (erected 28 March 1806, as the Diocese of Salta) is in Argentina and is a metropolitan diocese, responsible for the suffragan Dioceses of Catamarca, Jujuy and Orán as well as the Territorial Prelatures of Cafayate and Humahuaca.

History
It was created on 17 February 1807, the territory being taken from the ancient Diocese of Córdoba del Tucumán. Until 1898, it comprised also the civil Provinces of Tucumán, Santiago del Estero, and Catamarca, which were then detached to form new dioceses. It was elevated to an archdiocese on 20 April 1934.

Bishops

Ordinaries
Nicolás Videla del Pino (1807–1819)
José Eusebio Colombres (1858–1859)
Buenaventura Rizo Patrón, O.F.M. (1860–1884)
Pablo Padilla y Bárcena (1893–1898), appointed Bishop of Tucumán
Matías Linares y Sanzetenea (1898–1914)
José Calixto Gregorio Romero y Juárez (1914–1919)
Julio Campero y Aráoz (1923–1934)
Roberto José Tavella, S.D.B. (1934–1963)
Carlos Mariano Pérez Eslava, S.D.B. (1963–1984)
Moisés Julio Blanchoud (1984–1999)
Mario Antonio Cargnello (1999–present)

Coadjutor archbishop
Mario Antonio Cargnello (1998–1999)

Auxiliary bishops
Miguel Moisés Aráoz (1871–1883)
Pablo Padilla y Bárcena (1891–1893), appointed Bishop here
José Calixto Gregorio Romero y Juárez (1914–1919), appointed Bishop here
Pedro Reginaldo Lira (1958–1961), appointed Bishop of San Francisco
Carlos Horacio Ponce de Léon (1962–1966), appointed Bishop of San Nicolás de los Arroyos
Raúl Arsenio Casado (1975–1983), appointed Bishop of Jujuy

Territorial losses

References

Salta
Salta
Salta
Salta
1806 establishments in the Viceroyalty of the Río de la Plata